Campion is a British television mystery drama first broadcast on the BBC on 22 January 1989. Each of the eight stories featured across the two series, broadcast in 1989 and 1990 respectively, are adapted from the Albert Campion mystery novels written by Margery Allingham. The series starred Peter Davison as Albert Campion, Brian Glover as his manservant Magersfontein Lugg and Andrew Burt as his policeman friend Stanislaus Oates.

Four novels were adapted for each series, each of which was originally broadcast as two separate hour-long episodes. Davison himself sang the title music for the first series; in the second series, it was replaced with an instrumental version. A Lagonda 16/80 featured extensively in the series. The car used in the series is now kept in Germany.

The complete series was released on DVD on 12 May 2008, distributed by Acorn Media UK.

Cast
 Peter Davison as Albert Campion
 Brian Glover as Magersfontein Lugg 
 Andrew Burt as Stanislaus Oates

Episodes

Series 1 (1989)

Series 2 (1990)

References

External links

Comment on the adaptations at the Margery Allingham Archive
The credit sequence for the first series, at the BBC's Cult TV site (no longer maintained).
The credit sequence for series 2, as above.

Fictional amateur detectives
1989 British television series debuts
1990 British television series endings
1980s British drama television series
1990s British drama television series
Television series set in the 1930s
BBC television dramas
British detective television series
1980s British mystery television series
1990s British mystery television series
English-language television shows
Television shows set in the United Kingdom